Parapithecus is an extinct genus of primate that lived during the Late Eocene-Earliest Oligocene in what is now Egypt. Its members are considered to be basal anthropoids and the genus is closely related to Apidium. There are two known species. They lived about 40 to 33 million years ago.

Parapithecus had an unusual dentition, which contained no adult lower incisors. The upper dentition likely had four incisors. This means the adult dental formula can be expressed as: Incisors: 2/0; Canines: 1/1; Premolars: 3/3; Molars: 3/3.

Bibliography 

Oligocene primates
Prehistoric primate genera
Oligocene mammals of Africa
Fossil taxa described in 1910